is a Japanese former Nippon Professional Baseball outfielder.

References

External links

 Career statistics - NPB.jp 
 83 Yoshiie Tachibana PLAYERS2021 - Fukuoka SoftBank Hawks Official site

1958 births
Living people
Baseball people from Fukuoka Prefecture 
Japanese baseball players
Nippon Professional Baseball outfielders
Crown Lighter Lions players
Seibu Lions players
Hanshin Tigers players
Jungo Bears players
Japanese baseball coaches
Nippon Professional Baseball coaches